Llanfaelrhys is a village and former civil parish in the Welsh county of Gwynedd, located on the Llŷn Peninsula.  The parish was abolished in 1934 and incorporated into Aberdaron.

References

External links

Villages in Gwynedd
Aberdaron